The American Music Award for Favorite Soul/R&B Band/Duo/Group was awarded since 1974, but has been discontinued since 2009. Years reflect the year in which the awards were presented, for works released in the previous year (until 2003 onward when awards were handed out on November of the same year). The all-time winner in this category is tied between three acts, Boyz II Men, Earth, Wind & Fire and Gladys Knight & the Pips with 4 wins each.

Winners and nominees

1970s

1980s

1990s

2000s

Category facts

Multiple Wins

 4 wins
 Boyz II Men
 Earth, Wind & Fire
 Gladys Knight & the Pips

 3 wins
 Destiny's Child
 Kool & the Gang

 2 wins
 The Black Eyed Peas
 New Edition

Multiple Nominations

 6 nominations
 Earth, Wind & Fire

 5 nominations
 Boyz II Men
 Gladys Knight & the Pips
 Kool & the Gang
 The O'Jays

 4 nominations
 The Isley Brothers
 New Edition

 3 nominations
 Commodores
 Destiny's Child
 Dru Hill
 En Vogue
 The Gap Band
 Jagged Edge
 Jodeci
 KC and the Sunshine Band
 TLC

 2 nominations
 B2K
 Bell Biv DeVoe
 Cameo
 K-Ci & JoJo
 Salt-N-Pepa
 The Time

References

American Music Awards
Rhythm and blues
Awards established in 1974
1974 establishments in the United States
Awards established in 2005
Awards established in 2009
Awards disestablished in 2003
2003 disestablishments in the United States
Awards disestablished in 2006
Awards disestablished in 2009